L'Autre Pied was a one Michelin star restaurant situated in Marylebone, in London's West End in England, specialising in French cuisine.

The restaurant opened 1 November 2007 led by Marcus Eaves with the backing of established restaurateur David Moore of sister restaurant, Pied à Terre and pop-up restaurant Pieds Nus. When Eaves moved across to take the Head Chef role at Pied à Terre, Andy McFadden took over the reins. Andy continued to impress diners and critics and he landed the Head Chef position in the Pied à Terre kitchen in November 2015.  His successor was Graham Long who was welcomed back into the fold after his previous experience in the Pied à Terre kitchen working under Shane Osborn.

The main restaurant seated 53 with an additional 12 seats on the terrace. A private dining room seated up to 16 people. Its total capacity was 81 people. There was also outdoor seating available for diners. It featured prints by Richard Hamilton, Henry Moore, Gordon House and William Crozier as well as a pencil drawing by Matisse. Handcrafted tables were made by Toby Davis of Hunky Dory Designs and were a mix of Macassar Ebony, with placemats cut into the table-tops.

In January 2009, the restaurant was awarded its first Michelin star.

The restaurant closed on the 9th of September, 2017.

Awards and accolades
Best Newcomer BMW Square Meal Guide Spring 2008
Nominated for Best New Interior Time Out Award 2008
Best Newcomer Time Out Award 2008
3 AA Rosettes 
6/10 in Good Food Guide
One Michelin star

References

External links 
 L’Autre Pied website
 Shane Osborn biography

British companies established in 2007
French restaurants in London
Michelin Guide starred restaurants in the United Kingdom
Restaurants established in 2007